The 2012 Rostelecom Cup was the fourth event of six in the 2012–13 ISU Grand Prix of Figure Skating, a senior-level international invitational competition series. It was held at the Ice Palace Megasport in Moscow on November 8–11. Medals were awarded in the disciplines of men's singles, ladies' singles, pair skating, and ice dancing. Skaters earned points toward qualifying for the 2012–13 Grand Prix Final.

Eligibility
Skaters who reached the age of 14 by July 1, 2012 were eligible to compete on the senior Grand Prix circuit.

Prior to competing in a Grand Prix event, skaters were required to have earned the following scores (3/5 of the top scores at the 2012 World Championships):

Entries
The entries were as follows.

Overview
Canada's Patrick Chan led after the men's short program, followed by Russia's Konstantin Menshov and Japan's Takahiko Kozuka. Chan was also first in the free skating, with Nobunari Oda in second and Kozuka in third. Chan won the title, Kozuka finished with the silver medal, and the Czech Republic's Michal Březina took the bronze. Johnny Weir re-aggravated an injury to his anterior cruciate ligament and withdrew after the short program.

Gracie Gold of the United States won the ladies' short program ahead of Finland's Kiira Korpi and American Agnes Zawadzki. Korpi won the free skating and her first gold medal on the Grand Prix series, with Gold and Zawadzki taking silver and bronze respectively, their first GP medals.

Russia's Tatiana Volosozhar / Maxim Trankov won the pairs' short program ahead of teammates Vera Bazarova / Yuri Larionov and the United States' Caydee Denney / John Coughlin. The standings remained the same after the free skating.

Canada's Tessa Virtue / Scott Moir were first in the short dance, followed by Russia's Elena Ilinykh / Nikita Katsalapov and Victoria Sinitsina / Ruslan Zhiganshin. The standing remained the same after the free dance. Virtue / Moir won gold, Ilinykh / Katsalapov the silver, and Sinitsina / Zhiganshin their first senior Grand Prix medal.

Results

Men

Ladies

Pairs

Ice dancing

References

External links

 Result details
 Entries

Rostelecom Cup, 2012
Rostelecom Cup
2012 in Russian sport